Felix Bichsel (born 1897, date of death unknown) was a Swiss weightlifter. He competed in the men's lightweight event at the 1924 Summer Olympics.

References

External links
 

1897 births
Year of death missing
Swiss male weightlifters
Olympic weightlifters of Switzerland
Weightlifters at the 1924 Summer Olympics
Place of birth missing